Duncan Cummings (born 20 March 1958 in Manchester, England) is an Australian former association football player and coach.

Club career
Cummings joined Melbourne Hungaria Soccer Club as a 12-year-old in 1970. After six seasons with Melbourne he transferred to South Melbourne for a fee of 8,500 plus proceeds from a match between the two clubs. He played at South Melbourne until 1981.

International career
Cummings made his international debut for Australia as a 17-year-old in 1975, becoming the youngest player to represent Australia. After scoring on debut against China he played only more full international match, against Hong Kong in 1976.

References

Australian soccer players
Australia international soccer players
Living people
1958 births
Association football forwards